Sălaj may refer:
 Sălaj County, Romania
 Sălaj (river), in Romania